Blood group Rh(CE) polypeptide is a protein that in humans is encoded by the RHCE gene. RHCE has also recently been designated CD240CE (cluster of differentiation 240CE).

The Rh blood group system is the second most clinically significant of the blood groups, second only to ABO. It is also the most polymorphic of the blood groups, with variations due to deletions, gene conversions, and missense mutations. The Rh blood group includes this gene which encodes both the RhC and RhE antigens on a single polypeptide and a second gene which encodes the RhD protein. The classification of Rh-positive and Rh-negative individuals is determined by the presence or absence of the highly immunogenic RhD protein on the surface of erythrocytes. Alternative splicing of this gene results in four transcript variants encoding four different isoforms.

A recent study in the population of the island of Sardinia shows the association of a noncoding variant in the RHCE gene (rs630337) with an increased erythrocyte sedimentation rate(ESR). This suggest a possible causal effect of this polymorphism on this inflammatory marker despite not found in coding region of the gene.

References

Further reading

External links
 

Clusters of differentiation